Vakhid Masudov (Kazakh: Вахид Юнусұлы Масудов, Vahid İunusūly Masudov) - Soviet and Kazakh footballer, midfielder. He played for the national team of Kazakhstan. Master of Sports of the USSR (1986). Has a coaching category "A".

Career

In the spring of 1977 he made his debut in the team of masters «Khimik» (Dzhambul).

A year later, he moved to the «Xorazm» team from Xonqa, where he was recommended by ex-Khimik player Christopher Kaskinidi. Returning to Dzhambul in the fall of 1978, he received a summons to the military registration and enlistment office and went to serve in a team from Kyzylorda «Orbita».

In 1980, «Kairat's» mentor Igor Semyonovich Volchok called him to him, who created a team in Alma-Ata for the future. On 7 April 1980, Masudov made his debut for Kairat in the top league of the USSR Championship against «Dynamo» Tbilisi. In the second round of the 1980 season, he became a solid base player. He was the captain and leader of the team.

In 1990, spent one season for the «Terek». In 1991 he returned to «Kairat», for which he spoke for another 2 seasons.

On 1 June 1992, he made his debut for the national team of «Kazakhstan» in his home game against the national team of «Turkmenistan» in the Tournament for the Central Asian Cup.In total, he spent 10 matches for the national team, was the captain of the national team.

In 1993 he played for the «Dostyk club», from where in the autumn of 1993 he left to play in Germany in the «Oberliga» club «Preussen 07 Hameln». He also played for the German club Göttingen 05.

After returning from Germany, he became a playing coach at the «Aktobenets» club. In 1995 he played in «Elimai».

Manager

Since 1996 in coaching.

He headed "Kairat", at the same time he entered the field. At the end of the 1999 season, he left the team.

From August 1999 to May 2000, he headed «Taraz».

From July to December 2000, he coached the Karaganda club «Shakhtyor-Ispat-Karmet».

In 2001 he returned to Kairat, where he stayed only until August.

In 2001-2002 he coached the national team of Kazakhstan.

In 2002, he headed the «Vostok-Altyn» team.

June-July 2003 - coach in the «Aktobe-Lento» team.

In 2004 he worked with the «Zhetysu» club.

2005 - 2006 was headed by «Shakhtar» from Karaganda.

In 2007-2008 he headed «Kairat».

2009 - coach of «Lokomotiv». In February, after several months of working with the team, a week before the start of the championship of Kazakhstan, he wrote a letter of resignation of his own free will. 

In March 2009, he headed the «Atyrau» club. Soon, together with the team, he became the owner of the Cup of Kazakhstanin 2009.In March 2010, before the game with Aktobe for the Super Cup of Kazakhstan, he was fired from the team. 

In 2010, he led the «Vostok» League 1st League team and brought it to the Premier League. In May 2011, after 10 rounds, he left the team for family reasons (his wife's illness).
In August 2012, he joined the coaching staff of the Almaty «Kairat».

From 2013 to 2015, he coached the «Ordabasy», «Astana-1964» and «CSKA» clubs for the season.

Since February 2016, he became the head coach of the youth team of Kazakhstan.

From 2016 to 2017 he was the head coach of Ural «Akzhaiyk». 

In January 2018, Masudov was appointed head coach of «Atyrau», but after four starting defeats, he was dismissed in April.

2019 – «Taraz».
From January to June 2021, the coach of «Maktaaral».

June - July 2021 - headed «Aktobe». 

Since January 2022 - coach of «Kazakhstan U19».

From June 2022 to January 2023 head coach of «Shakhter» Karaganda.

References

External links
 Lyakhov.kz Kairat squad 2008 
 

1959 births
Living people
Soviet footballers
Kazakhstani footballers
Association football midfielders
FC Taraz players
FC Kaisar players
FC Kairat players
FC Akhmat Grozny players
FC Aktobe players
FC Spartak Semey players
Kazakhstan international footballers
Kazakhstani expatriate footballers
Expatriate footballers in Germany
Kazakhstani football managers
FC Dostyk managers
FC Aktobe managers
FC Yelimai managers
FC Kairat managers
FC Taraz managers
FC Shakhter Karagandy managers
Kazakhstan national football team managers
FC Vostok managers
FC Zhetysu managers
FC Astana managers
FC Atyrau managers
FC Ordabasy managers
FC Astana-1964 managers
Kazakhstan national under-21 football team managers
FC Akzhayik managers
People from Taraz